Buphedrone, also known as α-methylamino-butyrophenone (MABP), is a stimulant of the phenethylamine and cathinone chemical classes that was first synthesized in 1928. It is legal in most countries as a research chemical, as long as it is not intended for human consumption.

Chemistry 
Buphedrone is a beta-ketone and is related to the naturally occurring compounds, cathinone and cathine. It is also related to methamphetamine, differing by the β-ketone substituent (at the beta carbon) and an ethyl group replacing the methyl group at the carbon alpha to the amine. One other name for buphedrone is phenylacetoethyl-methylamine.

Buphedrone as free base is very unstable; it is prone to dimerization like other α-amino ketones. Because of this, it is sold as various salts, with a hydrochloride being most common.

Effects 
Buphedrone increases spontaneous rodent locomotor activity, potentiates the release of dopamine from dopaminergic nerve terminals in the brain, and causes appetite suppression. It also causes a possibly dangerous effect of decreasing subjective feeling of thirst. The effects of buphedrone have also been compared to methamphetamine, with more euphoria and less physical stimulation. Most commonly reported effects include:

 Elevated mood, euphoria
 Increased alertness
 Dilated pupils (rare)
 Slurred speech (rare)
 Increased heart rate
 Talkativeness
 Increased empathy and sense of communication
 Increased sex drive
 Temporary erectile dysfunction in men
 Restlessness
 Insomnia
 Increased motivation

Depending on the route of administration, the duration varies from approximately 2.5 (IV) to 6 hours (orally) and may be followed by unpleasant symptoms associated with withdrawal, which may include:
 Dysphoria
 Tiredness
 Sweating
 Loss of concentration

Legal status
As of October 2015 buphedrone was a controlled substance in China.

Buphedrone is an Anlage II controlled drug in Germany.

In the United States Buphedrone is considered a schedule 1 controlled substance as a positional isomer of Mephedrone.

See also 
 Pentedrone
 4-Methylbuphedrone
 4-Methylpentedrone

References 

Cathinones
Designer drugs
Norepinephrine-dopamine releasing agents